Philotheca salsolifolia is a species of flowering plant in the family Rutaceae and is endemic to New South Wales and the Australian Capital Territory. It is a shrub with crowded, more or less cylindrical leaves and pink to mauve flowers with a dark central stripe and arranged singly or in twos or threes on the ends of branchlets.

Description
The ten stamens are glabrous, fused together in the lower half, and densely hairy above.

Taxonomy
This species was first formally described in 1809 by James Edward Smith and given the name Eriostemon salsolifolius in Rees's The Cyclopaedia.
In 1917, George Claridge Druce changed the name to Philotheca salsolifolia in The Botanical Exchange Club and Society of the British Isles Report for 1916, Supplement 2.

In 1998, Paul Wilson described two subspecies in the journal Nuytsia, and the names are accepted by the Australian Plant Census:
 Philotheca salsolifolia (Sm.)

Distribution and habitat
Philotheca salsolifolia grows in heath in rocky or sandy places in forest and woodland. It is widespread in New South Wales and the Australian Capital Territory, from near Yamba in the north to Bega on the south coast and as far inland as West Wyalong and the Pilliga scrub. Subspecies pedicellata is only known from near Angourie on the north coast of New South Wales where it grows in coastal or near-coastal sand.

References

salsolifolia
Flora of New South Wales
Flora of the Australian Capital Territory
Plants described in 1809
Taxa named by James Edward Smith